Ugyen Dorji is a Bhutanese international footballer who currently plays for Transport United. He made his first appearance for the Bhutan national football team in 2011.

References

Bhutanese footballers
Bhutan international footballers
Transport United F.C. players
Living people
1992 births
Association football forwards